Kingsford is a suburb in the Eastern Suburbs of Sydney, in the state of New South Wales, Australia. Kingsford is located 7 kilometres south-east of the Sydney central business district, in the local government area of the City of Randwick. Kingsford is part of the Eastern Suburbs region.

Location

Kingsford is a mainly residential area, situated directly south of the University of New South Wales, which is in Kensington. Many of the residents are students living in medium and high density housing. A large Australian Army depot lies in the east of Kingsford. Kingsford surrounded by Daceyville to the south, Eastlakes to the west, Randwick to the north, and Maroubra to the south,

At the centre of Kingsford, on Anzac Parade and Gardeners Road, there was a large roundabout connecting a public transport system to nine possible destinations via a large number of bus services. For this reason, this part of Kingsford is sometimes referred to as "nine-ways". Due to construction on light rail, the roundabout has since been converted into an intersection with traffic lights. Kingsford is less than 5 km from Coogee Beach.

History 
The area was originally known as South Kensington. In 1936 it was renamed Kingsford to honour Australian aviator Sir Charles Kingsford Smith (1897–1935), as was the nearby Sydney Airport. Kingsford was undeveloped until a land boom in the 1920s.

On 19 December 1936 the coffin of Eileen O'Connor, who is likely to become Australia's second Catholic saint, was opened in a funeral home at 347 Anzac Parade, Kingsford. The body was found to be incorrupt although Eileen had died in 1921. The body was reinterred in the Coogee home of Our Lady's Nurses for the Poor, an order which Eileen had founded.

In the 1940s, many Greeks settled in the area, particularly migrants from the island of Castellorizo (or Kastellorizo). Many opened businesses in the area; and, in 1973, they built the Castellorizian Club on Anzac Parade. Kingsford was originally intended to be the terminus of the Eastern Suburbs railway line; but, as a cost-cutting measure, the line was terminated at Bondi Junction in 1979. A new light rail project linking Kingsford to the CBD via Anzac Parade opened in April 2020.

Charles Kingsford Smith Tribute 
In 2010, a tribute was created to Charles Kingsford Smith in Gardeners Lane, off Anzac Parade. The tribute consisted of a mosaic of Smith, a mosaic of his plane, the Southern Cross, and a Trans Pacific Mural depicting the Southern Cross. The tribute was unveiled on 11 August 2010 by Mayor John Procopiadis. It was designed by Masoud Nodous; the artist was Tim Cole. In 2014, the mural depicting the Southern Cross was added. The artist was Annette Barlow.

Population
In the 2016 Census, there were 15,482 people in Kingsford.  36.1% of people were born in Australia. The next most common countries of birth were China 18.0%, Indonesia 10.0%, Malaysia 2.9%, Greece 2.2% and England 2.1%. The most common ancestries in Kingsford (NSW) (State Suburbs) were Chinese 29.6%, English 11.3%, Australian 10.2%, Greek 6.8% and Irish 5.9%. 38.1% of people only spoke English at home. Other languages spoken at home included Mandarin 20.4%, Greek 5.9%, Cantonese 4.9%, Indonesian 7.0% and Spanish 1.3%. The most common responses for religion were No Religion 39.0% and Catholic 19.2%.

Politics
At the federal government level of politics, Kingsford is part of the Division of Kingsford Smith in the Australian House of Representatives. Kingsford Smith has always been a Labor (ALP) stronghold.

Churches and schools
 St Spyridon Church is a Greek Orthodox church on Gardeners Road. St Spyridon College is an independent school, with one campus located adjacent to the church. 
 The Indonesian Presbyterian Church and Kingsway Church are located at 94 Houston Road. 
 Holy Trinity Anglican Church is located at the corner of Anzac Pde & Sturt Street, Kingsford. 
 Gereja Focus Indonesia is an Indonesian students' church located on UNSW campus
 Kingsford Church of Christ is located on Anzac Parade

Gallery

References

Suburbs of Sydney